William Patrick Ludwig   (25 May 1934 – 11 April 2022) was an Australian trade union official, who served as National President of the Australian Workers' Union (AWU), with a brief interruption, from 1989 to 2017. He served two terms from 1989 until 1997 and from 2001 until 2017. He also served as Queensland Branch Secretary Queensland Branch Secretary of the Australian Workers' Union (AWU), from 1988 to 2013.

Biography
Ludwig was born in Longreach, Queensland on 25 May 1934, and was educated at Marist College in the Brisbane suburb of Ashgrove. He began his working life as a shearer and remained in the pastoral industry until 1971 when he became an employee of the AWU.

In 1982 Ludwig was elected as the South Western District Secretary of the Queensland Branch of the AWU, a position he held until he was elected as the Secretary of the Queensland Branch in 1988.

Ludwig was head of the powerful Labor Forum or AWU Faction which dominates the Queensland branch of the Australian Labor Party. Ludwig was a member of the ALP National Executive and Vice President of the ALP's Queensland Branch. His son Joseph Ludwig was an Barrister and ALP Senator from Queensland and was Minister for Agriculture, Fisheries and Forestry and Minister Assisting on Queensland Flood Recovery.

In the 1997 Australia Day Honours he was awarded the Medal of the Order of Australia (OAM) for "service to Industrial Relations through The Australian Workers' Union" and in 2001 he was awarded the Centenary Medal.

References

External links
Profile on the AWU National Website

1934 births
2022 deaths
Australian trade unionists
Recipients of the Medal of the Order of Australia
Australian people of German descent
Recipients of the Centenary Medal
People from Queensland